Paola Bontempi Fernàndez (born 12 September 1977) a Spanish actress & television host. Bontempi was born to Chilean parents: María de la Luz Fernández Stemann, mother of the deceased Chilean television presenter Felipe Camiroaga, and Fernando Bontempi.

Bontempi's mother has partial German descent, and her father has Italian blood, the reason of her surname Bontempi and her given name Paola. Bontempi has lived in Spain, the United Kingdom and the United States. She studied theater since she was eleven, and at age 21, she debuted as presenter in the Canarias television, hosting three different programs: Cifras y letras , El Expreso or Mira cómo va and was also seen in Mi Tierra Televisión.

She also appeared in series like La que se avecina (Tele5), Guante blanco (TVE), Maitena: Estados alterados (La Sexta) and Hospital Central (Tele 5). She has also participated in European movies.

In 2016, Bontempi portrayed Catherine of Aragon in the documentary drama series Six Wives with Lucy Worsley on BBC 1.

References

External links

People from Tenerife
Spanish film actresses
Spanish people of Chilean descent
Spanish people of German descent
Spanish people of Italian descent
Living people
Spanish television actresses
1977 births